The Brabham BT58 was a Formula One racing car designed by John Baldwin and Sergio Rinland for the Brabham team which raced in the  season. The teams cars were driven by Italian Stefano Modena and the 1988 World Sportscar Champion, the returning Martin Brundle. The best result achieved was a third place at the 1989 Monaco Grand Prix driven by Modena. The car was powered by the Judd V8 engine and ran on Pirelli tyres.

1989
After missing the entire  season, the first time since  that the Brabham name wasn't on the F1 grid as a constructor, the team was forced into pre-qualifying for 1989, largely thanks to the increased entry to Formula One that year in light of the new regulations that banned the powerful, but expensive, turbocharged engines. Brabham, making a welcome return to the F1 paddock, proved competitive with the Judd powered BT58, with Modena never failing to pre-qualify, while car problems saw Brundle only failing to do so twice (Canada and France). Both Brundle and Modena proved very competitive at the Monaco Grand Prix, running behind the all-conquering McLaren-Honda cars of Ayrton Senna and Alain Prost. Brundle was running a fine third late in the race when he was forced to pit to replace a dead battery, ultimately finishing sixth (unlike most other cars in the field, the BT58 had its battery under the driver's seat and not behind the driver's head, meaning Brundle had to vacate the car in the pits in order for the team to replace it). It was Modena who benefited from Brundle's misfortune as he would finish third behind the McLarens. The points scored at Monaco meant that the team 'graduated' from pre-qualifying for the second half of the season.

Part of the BT58's initial advantage was its Pirelli qualifying tyres, although like other teams using the Italian rubber, the race tyres were not of the same quality. However, during the last half of the season as Formula One moved to faster circuits such as Silverstone, Hockenheim and Monza, the BT58's lack of straight line speed, and Pirelli's less than competitive race tyres, saw that results were harder to come by, though Brundle did defy the odds by finishing sixth at Monza after Modena was excluded during qualifying when his car weighed in under the legal limit. After scoring 5 points in Monaco, the team would only score another 3 for the rest of the season, with Brundle finishing sixth in the Italian Grand Prix, and fifth in Japan.

1990
The BT58 was used for the first two races of the  season, with Modena finishing 5th in the season's opening race in Phoenix. The BT58 was replaced by the Brabham BT59 from the third race of the year in San Marino.

Complete Formula One results
(key)

* All points scored with the BT58

References

Brabham Formula One cars
1989 Formula One season cars
1990 Formula One season cars